Bhai Bala ( 1466–1544), born in Talwandi Rai Bhoi into a Sandhu Jat family (now called Nankana Sahib in Pakistan), was a childhood friend and lifelong companion of Bhai Mardana and Guru Nanak. According to the Bhai Bala Janam Sakhis, he traveled with Guru Nanak and Bhai Mardana on all of their great journeys around the world including China, Mecca, and around India. He supposedly died in Khadur Sahib, in his late 70s, in 1544.

Historicity
There has been considerable discussion as regards to Bhai Bala's existence, particularly within the Sikh academic field. The reasons for this are:

Bhai Gurdas, who has listed all Guru Nanak's prominent disciples (in his 11th Var), does not mention the name of Bhai Bala (this may be an oversight, for he does not mention Rai Bular either). However Bhai Mani Singh's Bhagat Ratanwali, which contains essentially the same list as that by Bhai Gurdas, but with more detail, also does not mention Bhai Bala. There are a number of other anomalies, which Dr. Kirpal Singh has explicated in his Punjabi work 'Janamsakhi Tradition.' According to H.S. Singha, some scholars argue that Bhai Bala was a genuine person, however his Janamsakhi hagiographies had been corrupted by heretical sects such as the Minas, Handaliyas, and others. The earliest extant Bala version rendition of the Janamsakhis itself claims to date to 1525 but this has been refuted by W.H. McLeod.

See also
Nankana Sahib
Panja Sahib
Janamsakhis

References

External links
Sikh history

1466 births
1544 deaths
16th-century Indian people
Guru Nanak Dev
People whose existence is disputed
Sikh saints
Converts to Sikhism from Hinduism